Zu cristatus, the scalloped ribbonfish, is a ribbonfish of the family Trachipteridae found circumglobally in all oceans at tropical latitudes, at depths down to 90 m.  Its length is up to 118 cm.

In the past, the binomial name Trachypterus iris was misapplied to this fish.

References

 

Trachipteridae
Fish described in 1819
Marine fish
Taxa named by Franco Andrea Bonelli